In Ireland, England, Wales, and the Scandinavian Peninsula, horse skulls have been found concealed in the structures of buildings, usually under the foundation or floor. Horse skulls have also been found in buildings in the United States, although in far fewer numbers. As part of the larger folk tradition of concealing objects in structures, horse skulls are related to concealed shoes, dried cats, and witch bottles.

There are two main theories as to the reason for depositing the horse skulls in buildings: as a method for enhancing the acoustics of a room, such as in a church or in a threshing barn; or as a method for repelling evil spirits such as witches and ghosts.

See also 

 Mari Lwyd

References 

 Master’s thesis, Anthropology Program, Ball State University, Muncie, IN.

External links 
 Horse Skulls at Bay Farm Cottage, Carnlough, Jim Mallory and Finbar McCormick.

Scandinavian culture
Irish culture
English culture
Horses in culture
Horses in religion
Skull
Welsh culture
Objects believed to protect from evil